Yan Yean is a locality in Melbourne, Victoria, Australia, 34 km north-east of Melbourne's central business district, located within the City of Whittlesea and Shire of Nillumbik local government areas.

Yan Yean contains Yan Yean Reservoir. Melbourne's first reservoir, a 560 hectare lake with a capacity of 30,000 megalitres, was first established in December 1853 and provides water to Melbourne's northern and central suburbs. A park around the reservoir, managed by Parks Victoria, offers picnic, barbecue and walking facilities.

History
Originally Yan Yean occupied quite a large area, and the first Yan Yean Post Office opened on 1 March 1859 and was replaced by Morang in 1861. The next Yan Yean Post Office opened in 1875 and was renamed Yan Yean South in 1892 (later Mernda). A Barber's Creek office (opened 1876) was renamed Yan Yean Railway Station in 1892, then Yan Yean in 1907 and closed in 1974.

Today
Yan Yean is the home of Bears Castle.

The Northern Melbourne Institute of TAFE operate a 200 hectare training property at Yan Yean dedicated to training students in cattle and deer farming, aquaculture and the production of medicinal herbs and essential oils.

Golfers play at the Growling Frog Golf Course on Donnybrook Road.

The Yan Yean Tennis Club is a 6 tennis court District level tennis club at TH Hurrey Reserve in Yan Yean, where a $3.9 million refurbishment began in 2017.

Yan Yean also contains a cemetery, fruit and berry farm, stock feed and a tin shop.

References

External links
 Yan Yean Reservoir Park (Parks Victoria)
 Yan Yean Reservoir (Melbourne Water)

Towns in Victoria (Australia)
Shire of Nillumbik
City of Whittlesea